Bianka Buša (born 25 July 1994) is a Serbian volleyball player, playing as wing spiker. She had played for ŽOK Vizura Belgrade before continuing an international career in Italy in 2015, with a brief stint in Romanian CSM Târgoviște. From 2017 to 2019 she joined Polish club KPS Chemik Police. She joined Alba Blaj in the start of season 2019–2020.

With the Serbia women's national volleyball team, she competed at the 2015 Women's European Volleyball Championship, winning bronze, 2017 Women's European Volleyball Championship, winning gold, the 2016 Summer Olympics in Rio, winning silver, 2018 FIVB Volleyball Women's World Championship, winning gold., 2019 Women's European Volleyball Championship, winning gold and 2022 FIVB Volleyball Women's World Championship, winning gold.

References

1994 births
Living people
Serbian women's volleyball players
Volleyball players at the 2015 European Games
European Games bronze medalists for Serbia
Volleyball players at the 2016 Summer Olympics
People from Vrbas, Serbia
Olympic volleyball players of Serbia
Olympic silver medalists for Serbia
Olympic medalists in volleyball
Medalists at the 2016 Summer Olympics
European champions for Serbia
European Games medalists in volleyball
Expatriate volleyball players in Italy
Serbian expatriate sportspeople in Italy
Expatriate volleyball players in Poland
Serbian expatriate sportspeople in Poland
Expatriate volleyball players in Romania
Serbian expatriate sportspeople in Romania
Volleyball players at the 2020 Summer Olympics
Medalists at the 2020 Summer Olympics
Olympic bronze medalists for Serbia